The 2021 Indy Pro 2000 Championship was the 23rd season in series history. An 18-round schedule was announced on October 21, 2020, featuring five permanent road courses, two street circuits, and two ovals. The series started on April 17, 2021 at Barber Motorsports Park.

Danish Christian Rasmussen, driving for Jay Howard Driver Development, won the championship in the last race of the season at the Mid-Ohio Sports Car Course.

Drivers and teams

Schedule 

* The race at Lucas Oil Raceway began on May 28, but was stopped and postponed to May 29 due to inclement weather.

* Following the cancellation of the Honda Indy Toronto, promoters replaced it with the second Mid-Ohio round.

Race results

Championship standings

Drivers' Championship
Scoring system

 The driver who qualified on pole was awarded one additional point.
 One point was awarded to the driver who led the most laps in a race.
 One point was awarded to the driver who set the fastest lap during the race.

Teams' championship 

 Scoring system

 Single car teams received 3 bonus points as an equivalency to multi-car teams
 Only the best two results counted for teams fielding more than two entries

See also 

 2021 IndyCar Series
 2021 Indy Lights
 2021 U.S. F2000 National Championship

Footnotes

References

External links 

 Indy Pro 2000 Championship Official Website

2021
Indy Pro 2000 Championship